Lonely Hearts is a 2006 American film directed and written by Todd Robinson. It is a neo-noir based on the true story of the notorious "Lonely Hearts Killers" spree killing of the 1940s, Martha Beck and Raymond Fernandez. The story of Beck and Fernandez was also the subject of the 1970 film The Honeymoon Killers, directed by Leonard Kastle and the 1996 film Deep Crimson, directed by Arturo Ripstein.

Plot

Conman Raymond Fernandez (Jared Leto) defrauds rich women through personal ads, and meets Martha Beck (Salma Hayek) who joins Raymond in his schemes, posing as his sister.
They begin traveling the country, murdering over a dozen women who respond to their ads. 
Homicide detectives Robinson (John Travolta) and Hildebrandt (James Gandolfini) track them down and bring them to justice.

Cast

Development and production
Filming began on March 21, 2005, with the majority of shooting taking place on location in and around historic venues in Jacksonville, Florida.  Portions were filmed in the historic Springfield district north of Downtown. The scene of the bungalow court was filmed at "Dancey Terrace" (Redell Street) which was at the time vacant but is now being restored. Additional shooting occurred in nearby Fernandina and Amelia Island.  Several scenes were shot in the Davenport Hotel in Spokane, Washington. Shots of the famous fireplace and Peacock Lounge can be seen in the background.

Jacksonville competed with Orlando and Ocala, Florida, and the state of Louisiana for the film. The film crew consisted of 218 local technicians, actors, and actresses, and 833 extras who generated a $3.28 million influx to the region.

Release
Lonely Hearts premiered in the U.S. at the Tribeca Film Festival on April 30, 2006. Following this the film had a screening at the Jacksonville Film Festival on May 18, 2006. The film was given a staggered release internationally throughout the final quarter of 2006 and into 2007. Lonely Hearts was scheduled to be given a limited release by Roadside Attractions in the U.S. on April 13, 2007. It was available to watch on Clickstar on-demand shortly after its domestic release.

Reception
The film earned $188,565 in the United States and Canada, and $2,330,589 in the rest of the world, for a combined gross of $2,519,154.

Critical reaction was mixed. On the review aggregator website Rotten Tomatoes, the film has a 47% approval rating from 43 reviews. The website's consensus reads, "Several genres and plotlines intertwine in Lonely Hearts but don't connect, creating an uneven and unsatisfying film."

Home media
The Region One DVD was released by Sony on July 31, 2007, although it was available for rental in several countries since late 2006.

References

External links
 Official website
 Lonely Hearts trailer
 
 
 CourtTV's Crime Library Case on The Lonely Hearts Killers
 

2006 films
Nu Image films
American serial killer films
Crime films based on actual events
Films shot in Jacksonville, Florida
Films set in the 1940s
MoviePass Films films
Roadside Attractions films
American neo-noir films
Films scored by Mychael Danna
Films directed by Todd Robinson (film director)
2000s English-language films
Films produced by Boaz Davidson
2000s American films